Wanli Education Group (WEG) is situated in the city of Ningbo in Zhejiang province, near Shanghai.

About the Group

In June 1993, WEG took over an engineer school on the verge of bankruptcy and established an international school whose offer ranges from kindergarten to higher education. 

In a decade or so, due to a rapidly increasing demand, WEG reached an enrollment level of 24,000 students, with a teaching and administrative staff of 2,100 people. 

Using a land surface of 3000 mu (200 hectares), WEG built a surface area of 1 million square meters. In the context of the educational reforms and modernization policies, WEG claims to be an experimental institution which is implementing a new kind of management model "centered on the students". After achieving a relative level of recognition in primary and secondary education, WEG is now trying to upgrade its higher education offer, notably through a joint-venture initiated in 2004 with the University of Nottingham in the UK.

At the moment, WEG's higher education offer in the city of Ningbo is divided between the Chinese-speaking and English-speaking campuses which are located in the same district of Yinzhou: 

Zhejiang Wanli university (浙江万里学院) 

University of Nottingham Ningbo, China (UNNC) 

At the provincial level, WEG may be compared with similar education groups like Hangzhou's Greentown (浙江绿城教育投资有限公司) which also operates a large network of schools from kindergarten to secondary education.

External links
 Wanli Education Group(in Chinese only)
 Zhejiang Wanli Institute (Law School, English version)
 Greentown Education Group (in Chinese only)

Education in Ningbo